Victor Lafón Airport  is an airport serving San Felipe, a city in the Valparaíso Region of Chile.

The airport is adjacent to the northeast side of the city. There is rising and mountainous terrain in all quadrants except southeast.

See also

Transport in Chile
List of airports in Chile

References

External links
OpenStreetMap - Víctor Lafón Airport
OurAirports - Víctor Lafón Airport
FallingRain - Víctor Lafón Airport

Airports in Chile
Airports in Valparaíso Region